Top Shelf Productions is an American publishing company founded in 1997, originally owned and operated by Chris Staros and Brett Warnock and a small staff. Now an imprint of IDW Publishing, Top Shelf is based in Marietta, Georgia.

Top Shelf publishes comics and graphic novels by authors such as Alan Moore, Craig Thompson, James Kochalka, Andy Runton, Jeffrey Brown, Nate Powell, Eddie Campbell, Alex Robinson, Jeff Lemire, and Matt Kindt.

History

The company was founded by Chris Staros and Brett Warnock after discussions between the pair at the 1997 Small Press Expo.  Previously, Warnock had used the Top Shelf name as the title for a self-published anthology, whilst Staros had worked in the industry representing Eddie Campbell in the United States and self-published a number of comics-based zines. The partnership evolved from combining Warnock's design skills and marketing abilities with Staros' talents for editing and book-keeping.  The duo started publishing under the name Primal Groove Press, but soon changed the name to Top Shelf.

The first title to be published by the new imprint was Pete Sickman-Garner's Hey, Mister: After School Special, a collection of Garner's previously self-published comic books along with two new tales.  Works by James Kochalka followed, and then in 1999 the company published Good-bye, Chunky Rice, a work which saw its creator, Craig Thompson, win a Harvey Award and which helped establish Top Shelf's reputation for publishing works of merit, with it being chosen as a book of the year by The Comics Journal (#220) alongside the Top Shelf-distributed From Hell.

Staros and Warnock have aimed to give their imprint a style "that is quite hip, but also quite endearing", and Staros regularly signs correspondence with the tagline "Your friend thru comics".  The company launched at a recessional period for comics, and saw themselves as, together with Fantagraphics, Drawn & Quarterly, and the now-defunct Highwater Books, attempting to "change the public perception and face of comics altogether".  In 2000 Staros delivered the keynote speech at the Ignatz Awards, and argued that the industry must focus more on content, and that more works of the merit of From Hell and Jimmy Corrigan would help the public re-evaluate their perceptions of the medium.

In April 2002 the collapse of the bookstore distributor LPC caused severe financial problems for the company.  A $20,000 check the distributor had issued bounced. Investigation by Top Shelf revealed an LPC filing for Chapter 11, a move which left Top Shelf in a perilous state:  The company had issued checks based on the LPC check clearing.  The company called upon the goodwill it had previously established in the comics market and issued a communication asking for help.  They asked former customers to "find it in your hearts to each spend around fifty bucks ... this would literally pull us through".  The communication swiftly spread across the internet, with both Neil Gaiman and Warren Ellis disseminating the appeal through their online presences.  The move created such an atmosphere that rival publisher and fellow LPC client Dark Horse felt moved to issue a statement to the effect that they were "in a profitable position."

Top Shelf were unprepared for the response, with a volunteer drafted to help pack the orders.  A second communication was issued a day later, declaring "Top Shelf Saved by Comics Community Record 12 Hours."  The move was greeted with envy by rival publishers, Tom Devlin of Highwater told The Comics Journal that although he viewed the move initially as maybe "a little pathetic", he later realized it as "the most remarkable marketing scheme", although qualifying that he didn't feel "there was a cynical moment" in Top Shelf's actions.

Top Shelf have slowly expanded their line and typically aim to launch works at conventions in order to generate a buzz. The 2004 Comic Con International saw the company launch eight books, of which two were immediate sell-outs.  This has at times caused unrest with retailers, particularly when Blankets was launched at the 2003 Comic Con International.  The company also followed this route with Alan Moore and Melinda Gebbie's Lost Girls, launching it at the 2006 Comic Con International.  The work had long been on the schedules of Top Shelf, initially intended as a three volume affair scheduled for a 2002 release. The eventual publication proved controversial, with Moore himself describing the work as "pornography" and Chris Staros admitting that publication was "putting the whole company on the line".  Before publication, fears were raised that the book would prove hard to sell given its nature, and that there may be legal implications.  However, the work received good reviews and the initial print run sold out in one day. The work has yet to be distributed in the United Kingdom, as the Great Ormond Street Hospital currently owns the copyright to Peter Pan.  Top Shelf agreed not to distribute the work in the UK until after that copyright expired at the end of 2007.  They do, however, refute that the work breaches the copyrights held.
  
On January 6, 2015, IDW Publishing announced that it had acquired Top Shelf Publishing. Top Shelf co-founder Warnock announced his retirement from comics publishing, while Staros stayed on as Top Shelf's editor-in-chief.

Titles

Pete Sickman-Garner
Titles by Pete Sickman-Garner are:

Hey Mister- Afterschool special
Hey Mister- Celebrity Roast
Hey Mister- The Fall Collection

Alan Moore
Titles by Alan Moore include:

Lost Girls (with Melinda Gebbie, 2006)
From Hell (with Eddie Campbell, 1999)
Voice of the Fire (1996)
The Mirror of Love (with Jose Villarrubia)
The League of Extraordinary Gentlemen, Volume III: Century (with Kevin O'Neill, 2009)
 The Moon and Serpent Bumper Book of Magic (with co-writer Steve Moore and artists including Kevin O'Neill, Melinda Gebbie, John Coulthart, and José Villarrubia, 320 pages, hardcover, 2009)

Craig Thompson

Titles by Craig Thompson include:

Blankets
Good-bye, Chunky Rice
Carnet de Voyage

Andy Runton

Titles by Andy Runton include:

Owly
 The Way Home
 Just A Little Blue
 Flying Lessons
 A Time To Be Brave

Jeffrey Brown
Titles by Jeffrey Brown include:

Clumsy
Unlikely
Aeiou
Every Girl Is The End Of The World For Me
I Am Going To Be Small
Be a Man
Minisulk
Bighead
Feeble Attempts
Incredible Change-Bots

James Kochalka
Titles by James Kochalka include:

SuperF*ckers
Monkey vs. Robot
American Elf
Pinky & Stinky
Conversation
Magic Boy and the Robot Elf
The Perfect Planet
The Johnny Boo series
Glork Patrol

Alex Robinson

Titles by Alex Robinson include:

Tricked
Box Office Poison
Bop! - More Box Office Poison
Too Cool To Be Forgotten
Alex Robinson's Lower Regions

Nate Powell

Titles by Nate Powell include:

Please Release
Swallow Me Whole
Any Empire

Renée French

Titles by Renée French include:

The Ticking
The Soap Lady
Micrographica

Jason Hall

Titles by Jason Hall include:

Pistolwhip (with Matt Kindt):
 Pistolwhip
 The Yellow Menace
 Mephisto & The Empty Box

Matt Kindt

Titles by Matt Kindt include:

2 Sisters
Pistolwhip (with Jason Hall):
 Pistolwhip
 The Yellow Menace
 Mephisto & The Empty Box
Super Spy

Jeff Lemire

Titles by Jeff Lemire include:
 Essex County Trilogy:
 Tales From The Farm (Top Shelf Productions, 2008)
 Ghost Stories (Top Shelf Productions, 2008)
 The Country Nurse (Top Shelf Productions, 2009)
 The Collected Essex County (Top Shelf Productions, 2009)
Contains the three main stories "Tales From The Farm", "Ghost Stories" and "The Country Nurse"
Added short stories "The Essex County Boxing Club" and "The Sad and Lonely Life of Eddie Elephant Ears."
Bonus materials, such as: unused promotion art, a deleted scene, character designs and so on.
 The Underwater Welder

Nicolas Mahler

Titles by Nicolas Mahler include:

Lone Racer
Van Helsing's Night Off

Tom Hart

Titles by Tom Hart include:

Hutch Owen:
 The Collected
 Unmarketable

Rich Koslowski

Titles by Rich Koslowski include:

The King
Three Fingers

Tony Consiglio

Titles by Tony Consiglio include:

110 Per¢
Doublecross

Dan James

Titles by Dan James include:

Mosquito
The Octopi & The Ocean

Max Estes

Titles by Max Estes include:

Coffee & Donuts
Hello, Again

David Yurkovich

Titles by David Yurkovich include:

Less Than Heroes
Death By Chocolate: Redux

Miscellanea

Other titles by various authors include:

AX: alternative manga edited by Sean Michael Wilson
Barefoot Serpent by Scott Morse
 Cigarette Girl by Masahiko Matsumoto
Comic Book Artist magazine edited by Jon B. Cooke
A Complete Lowlife by Ed Brubaker
Creature Tech by Doug TenNapel
Cry Yourself To Sleep by Jeremy Tinder
Dang! by Martin Cendreda
Discovered by Savannah College of Art and Design’s Sequential Art Program
Grampa & Julie: Shark Hunters by Jef Czekaj
 Keyhole by Dean Haspiel and Josh Neufeld
Korgi by Christian Slade
March: Book One by John Lewis and Andrew Aydin, illustrated by Nate Powell
Moving Pictures by Kathryn and Stuart Immonen
Regards From Serbia by Aleksandar Zograf
Same Difference & Other Stories by Derek Kirk Kim
Second Thoughts by Niklas Asker
Speechless by Peter Kuper
Spiral-Bound by Aaron Renier
Strong Female Protagonist by Brennan Lee Mulligan and Molly Ostertag
The Surrogates by Robert Venditti and Brett Weldele
Tales From The Farm by Jeff Lemire
Tales Of Woodsman Pete by Lilli Carre
That Salty Air by Tim Sievert
Will You Still Love Me If I Wet The Bed? by Liz Prince
World War 3 Illustrated by various

References

External links

Brett Warnock's Blog
 
Podcast Interview with Chris Staros
Interview with Brett Warnock at The Wright Opinion, from January 21, 2008
 

 
Publishers of adult comics
IDW Publishing
Comic book publishing companies of the United States
Publishing companies established in 1997
Companies based in Cobb County, Georgia
Marietta, Georgia
2015 mergers and acquisitions